Joseph John Lagowski was an American chemist working at The University of Texas at Austin.

Lagowski studied chemistry at the University of Illinois and received bachelor's degree in 1952. Later he studied at the University of Michigan to become Master of Science in 1954. In 1957 he finished graduate studies and received Ph.D. from Michigan State University. Lagowski continued studying in the University of Cambridge in England on a Marshall Scholarship with a title of D.Phil. received in 1959. He was a professor at The University of Texas from 1959 until his retirement in 2008.

His research dealt with non-aqueous solutions and organometallic pi-complexes. In 1978 he published a paper in which he described the strange spectroscopic and electrochemical behaviour of caesium and gold solution in liquid ammonia - pale yellow instead of blue colour was observed. This confirmed the existence of the auride ion Au−, which is a rare example of a single noble metal anion.
He was the sixth editor of the Journal of Chemical Education (1979–1996).

Notes

References
 University of Texas website

Year of birth missing
2014 deaths
American chemists
Alumni of the University of Cambridge
University of Illinois Urbana-Champaign alumni
University of Michigan alumni
Michigan State University alumni